A special election was held in  was held on September 11, 1826 to fill a vacancy caused by the resignation of Enoch Lincoln (A) in January, having been elected Governor of Maine.  As a majority was not achieved on the first ballot, a second election was held November 27.

Election results

Ripley took his seat December 4, 1826.  With his election, the 5th district changed from Adams Party control to Jacksonian control.

See also
List of special elections to the United States House of Representatives

References

Maine 1826 05
Maine 1826 05
1826 05
Maine 05
United States House of Representatives 05
United States House of Representatives 1826 05
September 1826 events
November 1826 events